The Hunt for the BTK Killer is a 2005 biographical horror television film directed by Stephen T. Kay. First shown on CBS, it is based on the true story of Dennis Rader, the notorious "BTK Killer" who murdered 10 people from 1974 to 1991. Though the events take place in Wichita, Kansas, the film was made in Nova Scotia.

Plot
After 31 years at-large, detectives in Wichita, Kansas home in on the serial killer known as BTK.

Cast

External links

2005 television films
2005 films
American biographical films
2000s crime drama films
Films shot in Nova Scotia
CBS network films
American crime drama films
2000s English-language films
Films directed by Stephen Kay
2000s American films
Sony Pictures direct-to-video films